The Batang uprising was an uprising by the Khampas of Kham against the assertion of authority by Qing China.

The uprising began as an opposition to the new policies of land reclamation and limits of the monastic community. The policies were implemented by Feng Quan, Qing's assistant amban to Tibet, stationed in Chamdo (in western Kham). Feng Quan was murdered in the uprising and  four French Catholic missionaries, perceived as Qing allies, fell victim to mobs led by lamas. One was killed immediately (his remains were never found), another was tortured for twelve days before he was executed, while the other two were pursued for three months and beheaded upon capture. Ten Catholic churches were burned down and a mass of locals that had converted to Catholicism were killed. Under French pressure to protect missionaries and domestic pressure to stop the threat of the British invading from the west frontier, Feng Quan's successor Zhao Erfeng led a bloody punitive campaign to quell the uprising in 1906. Zhao brought political, economic, and cultural reform to Batang and the rest of Kham. Direct rule of Batang under Qing was established by Zhao. With the 1911 Chinese Revolution, Zhao was murdered in turn and the status quo ante was reestablished.

Background

Power structure of Batang
The Batang town in Kham was at the frontier of Qing China where authority was shared between local Kham chiefs and local Tibetan Buddhist monastery. The lamas in the monastery were under the suzerainty of Lhasa, Tibet. While Kham chiefs as well as Tibet were under the Qing rule, the Qing authority over Tibet was weak.

The role of the British and the Qing
The British invasion of Tibet in 1904 had repercussions in the frontier region between Tibet and China (called "March country" or "Marches"). A Qing intervention within Tibet's frontier east of the Dri River (upper Yangtze river, also called Jinsha) was triggered in an effort to open up Tibet's frontier roads to Qing forces.

The role of the French missionaries

Tibetan Khampas in the frontier marches are known for their hostility towards outsiders, and for their strong devotion to their monasteries from specific schools of Tibetan Buddhism, and to the Dalai Lamas.

Decades before the Batang uprising, around 1852 the French Catholic Marist missions from Paris Foreign Missions Society, operating under Qing China's protectorate and ushered into Kham's frontier region, were "[d]riven back from the frontier and forced to withdraw to the Western confines of the Chinese provinces of Sichuan and Yunnan," where they "vegetated for a century within small Christian communities", until expelled by Communist China in 1952.

From 1873 to 1905, there were five attacks on churches (this Batang uprising being the fifth), known as "missionary cases" in historiography. Upon the complaint of the French consul, the Foreign Ministry of Qing settle the cases and gradually got involved into Batang politics.

Feng Quan's reform 
Qing China sent Feng Quan as the new Qing's assistant amban, stationing him in Chamdo. Qing emperor instructed him to develop, assimilate, and bring the Kham regions under strong Qing central control. Feng Quan began initiating land reforms among traditional autonomous polities of kingdoms governed by warrior chiefs, and initiating a reduction to the number of monks, whose monasteries were among the autonomous polities. Feng Quan recruited Chinese soldiers and Sichuan famers to convert idle land in Batang to cultivable land in the hope of attracting settlers.

Batang battles 
The Chiefdoms of Batang and Litang and the Tibetan monasteries rose up. 26–27 March 1905 marked the first bloodshed when a handful of Sichuan farmers were killed at the farm. On 6 April, Feng Quan was murdered, which the locals justified by claiming he had "promoted French military uniforms and military marches and therefore could not have been a genuine commissioner sent by the Qing".

Compensation of beheaded missionaries
Four French missionaries were killed by the locals, including Henri Mussot (牧守仁) on March 30 or 31, Jean-André Soulié (蘇烈) on April 14,  and Pierre-Marie Bourdonnec (蒲德元) as well as Jules Dubernard (余伯南) on July 23. Among them, Soulié was tortured for twelve days before execution. Ten Catholic churches were burned down and a mass of locals converted to Catholicism were killed. A compensation was reached between the Sichuan government's foreign affairs office (四川洋務局), the French consul in Chengdu and Bishop Pierre-Philippe Giraudeau (倪德隆). Sichuan compensated 121,500 silver tael of silver sycees, which would be paid from the tea tax revenues of Dartsedo town, Sichuan.

Punitive campaign 
The Qing Chinese responded to the Batang uprising with a punitive campaign. The Sichuan Army under the command of Chinese General Ma Wei-ch'i was said to launch the first retaliations against the Khampas - Chiefs, Lamas and lay people - at Batang, and against the monastery.

The punitive invasion by Han Bannerman General Zhao Erfeng in Kham is well documented, including the German origin of the army's rifles, and he was later called "the Butcher of Kham" for his work. Monks and Khampas were subjected to execution, beheadings, and dousings with fire. The monks at Batang reportedly withstood the invasion until 1906, but afterwards they and the monks from Chatring monastery were all killed, and their monasteries were destroyed. The Prince of Batang was also beheaded for taking part in the uprising.

Monasteries continued to be targeted by Zhao's forces, as did all autonomous polities in Kham as the raids spread and Zhao appointed Qing Chinese officials to positions of authority. Zhao's retaliatory invasion in Kham lasted through Qing China's larger invasion of Lhasa in 1910, and on to 1911, when Zhao was killed. Zhao's death was reportedly undertaken by his own men, during the collapse of the Qing dynasty and the rise of Chinese Republican revolutionary forces, around the time of the Xinhai Revolution.

A former Khampa Chushi Gangdruk Tibetan guerrilla named Aten gave the his account of the war, where he states the war started in 1903 when the Manchu Qing sent Zhao Erfeng to seize control of Tibetan areas, to control Batang and Litang. Aten recounted Zhao's destruction of Batang, and said Zhao used holy texts as shoeliners for his troops and that "[m]any Tibetans were executed by decapitation or by another typically Chinese method, mass burial while still alive." Aten also called the Manchus "alien conquerors".

Beijing author Tsering Woeser has defended the Tibetans in the Batang uprising, saying that Zhao Erfeng invaded the region to  "brutally stop Tibetan protests", while listing the atrocities committed by Zhao.

The Qing military invasion at Batang attempted to change the power structure in the region fundamentally. The historical system of autonomous polities was also attacked, and the region was briefly under Chinese military occupation, until 1911.

See also
 Kham
 Antireligious campaigns in China
 Anti-missionary riots in China
 Catholic Church in Sichuan
 Christianity in Tibet
 Religious persecution
 Tibet under Qing rule

Notes

References

Bibliography 
 

 
 
 
 
 
 

Massacres of Christians
Persecution of Catholics
Persecution by Buddhists
Roman Catholic missionaries in Sichuan
Roman Catholic missionaries in Tibet
Christian missions in China
History of Tibetan Buddhism
Mass murder in 1905
Military history of Tibet
Conflicts in 1905
Events in Yunnan
Military history of Sichuan
1905 in China
Wars involving the Qing dynasty
Rebellions in the Qing dynasty
Foreign relations of the Qing dynasty
1905 murders in China
Christianity in Yunnan